A proximity card or prox card  also known as a key card or keycard is a contactless smart card which can be read without inserting it into a reader device, as required by earlier magnetic stripe cards such as credit cards and contact type smart cards.  The proximity cards are part of the contactless card technologies. Held near an electronic reader for a moment they enable the identification of an encoded number.  The reader usually produces a beep or other sound to indicate the card has been read.

The term "proximity card" refers to the older 125 kHz devices as distinct from the newer 13.56 MHz contactless smartcards. Second generation prox cards are used for mass and distance reading applications. The card can often be left in a wallet or purse, and read by simply holding the wallet or purse near the reader. These early proximity cards can't  hold more data than a magnetic stripe card, and only cards with smart chips (ie, contactless smartcards) can hold other types of data like electronic funds balance for contactless payment systems, history data for time and attendance or biometric templates. When used without encoding data, only with the card serial number, contactless smartcards have similar functionalities to proximity cards.

Types

Passive cards 
Passive 125 kHz cards, the more widely used type which were described above, are powered by radio frequency signals from the reader device and so have a limited range and must be held close to the reader unit. They are used as keycards for access control doors in office buildings. A version with more memory, contactless smartcards, are used for other applications: library cards,  contactless payment systems, and public transit fare cards.

Active cards 
Active 125 kHz prox cards, sometimes called vicinity cards, are powered by an internal lithium battery.  They can have a greater range, up to 2 meters (6 ft). Other contactless technologies like UHF (Ultra High Frequency) smart cards  can reach up to 150 meters (500 ft) and are often used for applications where the card is read inside a vehicle, such as security gates which open when a vehicle with the access card inside approaches, or automated toll collection.  The battery eventually runs down, however, and the card must be replaced after 2 to 7 years.

Method of operation 
The card and the reader unit communicate with each other through 125 kHz radio frequency fields (13.56 MHz for the contactless smartcard cards) by a process called resonant energy transfer.  Passive cards have three components which are sealed inside the plastic: an antenna consisting of a coil of wire, a capacitor, and an integrated circuit (IC) which contains the user's ID number in specific formats and no other data.  The reader has its own antenna, which continuously transmits a short range radio frequency field.

When the card is placed within range of the reader, the antenna coil and capacitor, which form a tuned circuit, absorb and store energy from the field, resonating at the frequency emitted by the reader. This energy is rectified to direct current which powers the integrated circuit.  The chip sends its ID number or other data to the antenna coil, which transmits it by radio frequency signals back to the reader unit. The reader checks whether the ID number from the card is correct, and then performs whatever function it has been programmed to do for that ID number. All the energy to power the card comes from the reader unit, so passive cards must be close to a reader to transmit their data.

An active card contains a flat lithium cell in addition to the above components to power it. The integrated circuit contains a receiver which uses the battery's power to amplify the signal from the reader unit so it is stronger, allowing the card to detect the reader at a greater distance. The battery also powers a transmitter circuit in the chip which transmits a stronger return signal to cover the greater distance.

Standards for Proximity cards 
Proximity cards are all proprietary. This is also the case of the memory-based first generation of contactless smartcards. This means that there is no compatibility between the readers of a specific brand and the cards of another brand.

Contactless smartcards are covered by the ISO/IEC 14443 and/or the ISO/IEC 15693 OR ISO/IEC 18000 standards.
The reality is that ISO/IEC 14443 as well as ISO/IEC 15693 can only be fully implemented on microprocessor-based cards. The best way to check if a technology meets ISO standard is to ask the manufacturer if it can be emulated on other devices without any proprietary hardware.

125 kHz Readers and formats 
The card readers communicate in various protocols, for example the Wiegand protocol that consists of a data 0 and a data 1 circuit (or binary or simple on/off (digital) type circuit). Other known protocols are mono directional Clock and Data or bidirectional OSDP (RS 485), RS 232 or UART.  The earliest card formats were up to 64 bits long. As demand has increased, bit size has increased to continue to provide unique numbers. Often, the first several bits can be made identical; these are called facility or site codes. The idea is that company A has a facility code of xn and a card set of 0001 through 1000 and company B has a facility code of yn and a card set also of 0001 through 1000. For smartcards, a numbering system is internationally harmonized and allocated by Netherlands-based NEN (registration authority) according to ISO/IEC 6523 and ISO/IEC 15459 standards.

See also

 Access badge
 Access control
 Campus card
 CharlieCard
 Common Access Card
 Credential
 Identity document
 Keycard
 Magnetic stripe card
 Near-field communication
 Photo identification
 Physical security
 Security
 Smart card
 Wiegand interface

References